Currentology is a science that studies the internal movements of water masses.

Description

In the study of fluid mechanics, researchers attempt to give a correct explanation of marine currents.   Currents are caused by external driving forces such as wind, gravitational effects, coriolis forces and physical differences between various water masses, the main parameter being the difference of density that varies in function of the temperature and salinity.

The study of currents, combined with other factors such as tides and waves is relevant for understanding marine hydrodynamics and linked processes such as sediment transport and climate balance.

The measurement of maritime currents 

The measurements of maritime currents can be made according to different techniques:

 current meter  
 diversion buoys

See also

References 

Oceanography